Mem is a Portuguese and English given name. The Portuguese name is an alternative form of Mendo. 

"Mem" is also used as a male and female nickname.

Notable people with the name include:

People with the given name
 Mem de Sá (c. 1500 – 1572), Governor-General of Brazil
 Mem Ferda (born 1963), British screen actor
 Mem Nahadr (fl. from 1997), American performance artist
 Mem Rodrigues de Briteiros (c. 1225 – c. 1270), Portuguese nobleman
 Mem Shannon (born 1959), American blues musician
 Mem Soares de Melo, 1st Lord de Melo (c. 1200 – 1262), Portuguese nobleman

People with the nickname
 Mem Fox (Marrion Fox; born 1946), Australian author
 Mem Lovett (Merritt Lovett; 1912–1995), American baseball player
 Mem Morrison (Mehmet Muhaurem Ramadan, fl. from 1997)), British performance artist